The White County School District is a public school district in White County, Georgia, United States, based in Cleveland, Georgia. It serves the communities of Cleveland and Helen.

Schools
The White County School District has four elementary schools, one middle school, one high school, and one building used for night school.

Elementary schools
Jack P Nix Elementary School
Mossy Creek Elementary School
Mount Yonah Elementary School
Tesnatee Gap Elementary School

Middle school
White County Middle School

Night School
Mountain Education

High school
White County High School

References

External links

School districts in Georgia (U.S. state)
Education in White County, Georgia